Radio Rochela was a Venezuelan television sketch comedy and variety show, created by Argentine producer Tito Martinez Del Box.

Characteristics

The show premiered on Radio Caracas Televisión (RCTV), a terrestrial television network in Caracas from 1959 to 2010, under the original title of La Cruzada del Buen Humor.

The show's sketches parodied contemporary Venezuelan culture and Politics.
Each week, the show featured a host who is currently an RCTV telenovela actor or actress who is pranked and performs in sketches with the cast.

Throughout its five decades on air, Radio Rochela has been recognized as ‘’the most important comedy show on Venezuela’’ . Radio Rochela was mentioned in the Guinness Book of Records as the comedy television show in history longest, being air uninterrupted for 5 decades. Cast members included Juan Ernesto López, Cayito Aponte, Elisa Parejo, Juan Carlos Barry, Americo Navarro, Joselo, Félix Granados, Ariel Fedullo, Jorge Citino, Eduardo Martínez del Box, Napoleon Rivero, Olimpia Maldonado, Ricardo Pimentel, Alexander Noguera, Norah Suárez, Laureano Márquez, Perucho Conde, Carlos Rodríguez, Coco Sánchez, Hilda Fuenmayor, Ivette Dominguez, Roy Díaz,  Karen Leiba, Gladiuska Acosta, Ricardo Gruber, Héctor Vargas, Joseline Rodriguez, Jorge Tuero,  Marinés Hernández, Alexxey Córdova and Gilberto González.

History

In the year 1959, a group of students at the Central University of Venezuela decided to begin a series of comedy acts at the architecture school.  The Argentine producer Tito Martinez Del Box, never saw one of their presentations but he has a part of the El Show de las Doce, hosted by Victor Saume.  La Gran Cruzada del Buen Humor' became one of the most popular segments on this midday show.

Finally in 1960, La Gran Cruzada del Buen Humor was separated from El Show de las Doce and was renamed Radio Rochela''.  The show went on the air Monday at 8:00 pm on RCTV. In the 1970s and 1980s "Radio Rochela" was one of the most popular programs in Venezuela.

On May 27, 2007, RCTV went off the air after the government of Hugo Chávez refused to renew its broadcast license (Chávez had announced that his government would not renew RCTV's license on December 28, 2006).  On June 4, 2007, a week after RCTV's shut down, there was a Radio Rochela special that aired on Globovisión during Aló Ciudadano.

On July 16, 2007, RCTV resumed broadcast on cable and satellite, and so did "Radio Rochela" with Wladimir Gimenez as executive producer and Alvaro Ignacio "Nacho" Palacios as head writer.

Cast

Many popular Venezuelan comedians have worked on Radio Rochela. All members have the ability to characterize any famous people (politicians, artists, etc.) because the program constantly parodies programs, celebrities and politicians. Entire cast:

 Cayito Aponte  †
 Henry Rodríguez
 Américo Navarro (1961–1985)
 Fausto Verdial†
 Virgilio Galindo ("Ruyío") †
 Betty Hass
 Irma Palmieri  †
 José Ignacio Cadavieco
 Argenis Angarita
 Pedro Elías Belisario 
 Cesar Granados ("Bolido")†
 Joselo (1960–1964) †
 Jorge Tuero†
 Juan Carlos Barry ("El Machazo")
 Nelly Pujols
 Kiko Mendive †
 Nelson Paredes ("Cara de Piedra")  †
 Olimpia Maldonado  †
 Honorio Torrealba † (1977–1988)
 Romelia Agüero
 Haydeé Tosta
 Manolo Malpica ("Semillita")
 Karla Luzbel †
 Emilio Lovera (1982–2005)
 Juan Ernesto López (Pepeto) (1959–2010)  †
 Umberto Buonocuore †
 Charles Barry †
 Roberto Hernández †
 Laureano Márquez
 Gilberto González
 Elisa Parejo (1959–2010)
 Gilberto Varela
Norah Suárez (1989–2010)
 César "Nené" Quintana
 Milton Izquierdo
 Pedro ("el Gato") Soto †
 Gladiuska Acosta (La Coconaza).
 Beto Parra
 Ricardo Gruber
 Victor Hernández
 Juan Carlos Barry
 Ariel Fedullo
 Martha Olivo "Malula"  †
 Ivette Domínguez
 Gioconda Pérez
 Jackeline Márquez
 Martha Piñango †
 Jorge Citino
 Tito Martínez del Box  †
 Eduardo Martínez del Box  † 
 Nancy Soto
 Toco Gómez
 Perucho Conde
 Roy Díaz
 Ricardo Pimentel †
 Victor Cuica
 Franco Colmenares
 Maribel Zambrano
 Fina Rojas  †

Notes

Í am Américo Navarro, There are a mistake I Start in 1.959 in La gran Cruzada del Buen Humor, it was the first name of Radio Rochela and went off in 1.989 to other place. Please correct tus date, for me, thank to much.

External links
List of programs broadcast by RCTV

Venezuelan comedy television series
1990s Venezuelan television series
2000s Venezuelan television series
2010s Venezuelan television series
1959 Venezuelan television series debuts
2010 Venezuelan television series endings
1950s Venezuelan television series
1960s Venezuelan television series
1970s Venezuelan television series
1980s Venezuelan television series